The shortnose demon catshark (Apristurus internatus) is a catshark of the family Scyliorhinidae found only in deep water in the East China Sea.  Its length is up to 40 cm. A. internatus is known only from the holotype (a 49.1-cm-total length female) and a paratype (a 40.3-cm male), both caught in the East China Sea, probably taken as bycatch in deepwater trawl fisheries. The reproduction of this catshark is oviparous.

References

Nakaya, K. and K. Sato, 1999. Species grouping within the genus Apristurus (Elasmobranchii: Scyliorhinidae). p. 307-320 In Séret B. & J.-Y. Sire [eds]. Proc. 5th Indo-Pac. Fish Conf., Noumea, 1997.

shortnose demon catshark
Marine fauna of East Asia
East China Sea
Taxa named by Deng Si-Ming
Taxa named by Zhan Hong-Xi
shortnose demon catshark